Rubén Camarillo Ortega (born 13 November 1961) is a Mexican politician affiliated with the PAN. He currently serves as Deputy of the LXII Legislature of the Mexican Congress representing Aguascalientes. He also served as Senator during the LX and LXI Legislatures.

References

1961 births
Living people
Politicians from Aguascalientes
People from Aguascalientes City
Members of the Congress of Aguascalientes
Members of the Senate of the Republic (Mexico)
Members of the Chamber of Deputies (Mexico)
Academic staff of the Instituto Politécnico Nacional
Academic staff of the Autonomous University of Aguascalientes
National Action Party (Mexico) politicians
21st-century Mexican politicians
Aguascalientes Institute of Technology alumni